Benjamin James Agajanian (August 28, 1919 – February 8, 2018), nicknamed "the Toeless Wonder", was an Armenian-American football player, primarily a placekicker in the National Football League (NFL), the All-America Football Conference (AAFC) and American Football League (AFL).

Early life
Born in Santa Ana, California, he graduated from San Pedro High School in the San Pedro community in Los Angeles. A placekicker, he played college football at Compton Junior College and the University of New Mexico in Albuquerque. He served in the U.S. Army Air Forces during World War II as a physical training instructor. While playing in college, Agajanian had four toes of his kicking foot crushed in a work accident and then amputated in 1939,

Pro football career
Agajanian played professionally in the National Football League from 1945 through 1959, then in the newly formed American Football League for the Los Angeles/San Diego Chargers in 1960, 1961, and 1964.  He also played for the Dallas Texans in 1961 and the Oakland Raiders in 1962.  He is one of two players (the other was Hardy Brown) who played in the All-America Football Conference, the American Football League, and the National Football League.

He was pro football's third kicking specialist (after Jack Manders and Mose Kelsch), booting field goals for 10 different professional teams in the 1940s, 1950s and 1960s, including two NFL champions: the New York Giants in 1956 and the Green Bay Packers in 1961. In the 1956 title game, he went 5-for-6 on extra points and 2-for-3 on field goals whole in the 1960 title game he was perfect on extra points (one) and field goals (three). 

He led the league in field goal attempts in 1947 (24) and 1954 (25) and also led in made field goals (15) in the former.

Later life
After retiring from the field at age 45, he was the Dallas Cowboys kicking coach for 20 years. He also coached Chicago Bears kicker Mac Percival for the 1968 season.

Agajanian died in Cathedral City, California, on February 8, 2018, at age 98. His older brother was the late Motorsports promoter J. C. Agajanian.

See also

 History of the New York Giants (1925–78)
 List of American Football League players
 History of the Armenian Americans in Los Angeles

References

External links

 Ben Agajanian, the oldest living Los Angeles Ram at 96, gets a real kick out of their return to L.A.
 
 "Ben Agajanian, Square-Shoed Kicking Star, Dies at 98," by RICHARD GOLDSTEIN, The New York Times, Feb. 13, 2018

1919 births
2018 deaths
American football placekickers
Players of American football from California
Dallas Cowboys coaches
Dallas Texans (AFL) players
Green Bay Packers players
Los Angeles Chargers players
Los Angeles Dons players
New Mexico Lobos football players
New York Giants players
Oakland Raiders players
Philadelphia Eagles players
Pittsburgh Steelers players
San Diego Chargers players
Sportspeople from Santa Ana, California
American people of Armenian descent
American Football League players
United States Army Air Forces personnel of World War II
United States Army Air Forces soldiers